Michael Söderlund (born 30 March 1962 in Karlskrona, Blekinge) is a former swimmer from Sweden who competed in three consecutive Summer Olympics, between 1980 to 1988. In the 1984 Summer Olympics, he was a part of the 4×100 m freestyle relay team, swimming one leg in the prelims. His best individual result in the Olympics was a 6th place on 200 m backstroke on the time of 2:04.10, which was a Swedish record for 27 years. Soderlund was on the 400-meter freestyle relay team that captured the bronze medal in the ’84 Olympiad at Los Angeles.

Personal bests

Long course (50 m)

Clubs
Karlskrona SS

External links
 
 

1962 births
Living people
Olympic swimmers of Sweden
Swimmers at the 1980 Summer Olympics
Swimmers at the 1984 Summer Olympics
Swimmers at the 1988 Summer Olympics
Olympic bronze medalists for Sweden
European Aquatics Championships medalists in swimming
Karlskrona SS swimmers
Medalists at the 1984 Summer Olympics
Swedish male freestyle swimmers
Swedish male backstroke swimmers
People from Karlskrona
Sportspeople from Blekinge County